Troy Campbell (born 31 July 1972) is an Australian former professional rugby league footballer who played as a  and  for the Parramatta Eels and the Gold Coast Chargers in the 1990s.

Playing career 
Campbell made his debut for Parramatta in Round 17 of the 1994 season against the Balmain Tigers.  At Parramatta, Campbell was awarded the 1996 Mick Cronin Clubman of the Year award and helped the club to the 1997 World Sevens title, where he was named player of the series.  In 1998, Campbell moved to the Gold Coast Chargers and played three games before retiring at the end of the season.

References

1972 births
Living people
Australian rugby league players
Parramatta Eels players
Rugby league hookers
Gold Coast Chargers players
Rugby league players from Orange, New South Wales